Ivanovsky (masculine), Ivanovskaya (feminine), or Ivanovskoye (neuter), are forms of a Russian adjective derived from the first name Ivan. It may refer to:

People
Ivanovsky (surname) (feminine: Ivanovskaya), Russian surname

Places
Ivanovsky District, name of several districts in Russia
Ivanovsky Municipal Okrug, a municipal okrug of Nevsky District of St. Petersburg, Russia
Ivanovsky (rural locality) (Ivanovskaya, Ivanovskoye), name of several rural localities in Russia
Ivanovo Oblast, a federal subject of Russia
Ivanovskoye District, a district of Eastern Administrative Okrug, Moscow, Russia
Ivanovsky Waterfall, a waterfall in Sochi National Park, Russia

See also
Ivanivske (disambiguation)
Ivanovski (feminine: Ivanovska), Macedonian surname